The Plot Thickens is a 1936 mystery film directed by William Sistrom, starring James Gleason and ZaSu Pitts, who plays the schoolteacher and amateur sleuth Hildegarde Withers from Stuart Palmer's stories. Gleason reprised his role as Hildegarde's friendly nemesis, Inspector Oscar Piper, from RKO Radio Pictures' previous Hildegarde Withers films.

Plot

Hildegarde Withers (ZaSu Pitts) is a novelist who now tries to figure out the connection between two unrelated murders. Inspector Oscar Piper (James Gleason), is Hildegarde's friendly nemesis.

Cast
 James Gleason as Oscar Piper
 ZaSu Pitts as Hildegarde Withers
 Owen Davis, Jr. as Robert 'Bob' Wilkins
 Louise Latimer as Alice Stevens
 Arthur Aylesworth as Kendall, the Butler
 Paul Fix as Joe, the Chauffeur
 Richard Tucker as John Carter
 Barbara Barondess as Marie, the Maid
 James Donlan as Jim, a Detective
 Agnes Anderson as Dagmar, the Sculptor
 Oscar Apfel as H. G. Robbins
 John T. Bambury as Midget (uncredited)

References

External links
 
 
 
 

1936 films
1930s comedy mystery films
American mystery films
American black-and-white films
Films about writers
Films based on American novels
Films set in New York City
Hildegarde Withers
1936 comedy films
RKO Pictures films
Films directed by Ben Holmes
1930s English-language films
1930s American films